S. occultus may refer to:
 Saltuarius occultus, a gecko species in the genus Saltuarius
 Selenops occultus, a spider species in the genus Selenops
 Stagnicola occultus, a gastropod species

See also
 Occultus (disambiguation)